"Purple Medley" is a medley of songs by American musician Prince from 1995. There is no album accompanying the single. The track is a mix of many hits and well-known songs from Prince's career. Some of the pieces of music are samples, while others are re-recorded for the mix. Some of the additional instrumentation is credited to The New Power Generation. The "Purple Medley" consists of snippets from the songs: "Batdance", "When Doves Cry", "Kiss", "Erotic City", "Darling Nikki", "1999", "Baby I'm a Star", "Diamonds and Pearls", "Purple Rain" and "Let's Go Crazy" and fades for the edit. The full version continues with "Sexy Dancer", "Let's Work", "Irresistible Bitch" (with the music of "Sexy MF"), "I Wanna Be Your Lover", "Alphabet St.", "Thieves in the Temple", the bassline to The Time's "777-9311", Sheila E.'s "A Love Bizarre", "If I Was Your Girlfriend", "Raspberry Beret", "Little Red Corvette", "Cream" and "Peach".

The CD single release includes both the full version of the medley (which clocks in at 11 minutes) and the edited version, which is 3:14 in length, and omits about half of the tracks present in the full version. Despite, in essence, being a megamix of Prince's biggest hits (barring "The Most Beautiful Girl in the World"), the B-side of the single is "Kirk J's B-Sides Remix" which consists of additional Prince hits remixed (oddly, only one was an actual B-side). This track appears to have little additional input from Prince, but is rather a compilation of remixes made by band member Kirk Johnson. The compilation includes bits of "Pop Life", "Housequake", "When Doves Cry", "Shockadelica", "Head" and "The Continental". The remix of "The Continental" was released in a longer version on the 1998 compilation Crystal Ball as "Tell Me How U Wanna B Done".

Chart performance
The song performed rather poorly in the charts worldwide and received very little night airplay in the US on radio station mixshows. It peaked at number 84 on the Billboard Hot 100 and number 74 on the R&B chart. In the UK, the medley reached number 33.

Music video
On January 26, 1996, VH1 aired Love 4 One Another, a one-hour Artist special. The "Purple Medley" video takes place as one of Prince's biggest fans sneaks backstage and watches the video on a floppy disk. The video uses old Prince footage, with new footage of the NPG and Prince's first wife Mayte Garcia during songs which don't have clips, such as "Sexy Dancer", "Let's Work", "Irresistible Bitch" and "If I Was Your Girlfriend". It also features live footage from the Tokyo Dome. It cuts short during "If I Was Your Girlfriend", then repeats the spoken introduction from "Let's Go Crazy" and displays the burial of Prince's chain cap that he wears in the "My Name Is Prince" clip, which consisted of footage from 3 Chains o' Gold. A screen then displays "Prince: 1958–1993. May He Rest In Peace." A full version was done, however, and circulates on bootlegs.

Charts

References

Prince (musician) songs
1995 singles
Music medleys
Songs written by Prince (musician)
Song recordings produced by Prince (musician)
Warner Records singles